Helen Mary Boswell Rushall  (née Helen Mary Cruickshank, 22 April 1914 – 15 October 1984) was a British schoolteacher who helped to form the National Council of Women in Burma, an affiliate of the International Council of Women. In 1958 she was made a Member of the Order of the British Empire (MBE) in recognition of her work on the council and her rehabilitation work after World War II.

Life and career
Helen Mary Cruickshank was born on 22 April 1914 in Rothienorman, Aberdeenshire to John Walker Cruickshank (1882–1969) and Janet Isabella Caldow (1883–1932). She was the eldest of four children; her younger siblings were Jean Caldow (1916–2001), James Robert (1918–1942) and Ian Armstrong (1919–2014). Her brother James was a pilot officer with No. 239 Squadron of the Royal Air Force, and died when his plane crashed in Normandy on 19 August 1942. Cruickshank attended the Inverurie Academy and Aberdeen High School for Girls. After completing her education, she worked as a domestic science teacher in Chesterfield.

In 1945 Cruickshank married Richard Boswell Rushall, the director of Rushall & Co. Ltd., a shipping company founded by his father in Rangoon, Burma. That year, she moved out to Rangoon with her husband, where they stayed for the next ten years. While in Burma, she took an active role in furthering Burma-British relations by helping to form the National Council of Women in Burma, an affiliate of the International Council of Women. She also worked in rehabilitation, helping to build clinics for the Burmese people. During this time, Helen Rushall and her husband had two children together, a son and a daughter.

The Rushall family returned to the UK in 1955. They lived in Aberdeen for two years, before moving to Christchurch, Dorset. In 1958 Rushall was made an MBE as part of the New Year Honours in recognition of her work on the executive committee of the council, as well as her rehabilitation work after World War II. She attended the investiture in Buckingham Palace on 12 March that year. Rushall died on 15 October 1984 in Christchurch, at the age of 70.

References

1914 births
1984 deaths
Members of the Order of the British Empire
People educated at Harlaw Academy
People from Aberdeenshire
Scottish feminists
Scottish schoolteachers
British people in British Burma
British expatriates in Myanmar